Deitch is a surname. Notable people with the surname include:

Adam Deitch, American record producer and drummer
Donna Deitch (born 1945), American film and television director, producer and writer 
Gene Deitch (born 1924), American illustrator, animator and film director
Jeffrey Deitch (born 1952), American art dealer and curator
Joseph Deitch (born 1950), American business executive, philanthropist and author
Kim Deitch (born 1944), American cartoonist

See also
Deitch Projects